Platyptilia farfarellus is a moth of the family Pterophoridae. The species was described by Philipp Christoph Zeller in 1867. It is found from central and southern Europe to Asia Minor, Micronesia and Japan (the islands of Hokkaido, Honshu, Shikoku and Kyushu). It is also known from Africa, where it has been recorded from Equatorial Guinea, Kenya, Madagascar, Mauritius, Nigeria, South Africa, São Tomé & Principe, Tanzania, Uganda, the Seychelles and Malawi.

The length of the forewings is 7–11 mm.

The larvae feed on Calendula arvensis, Calendula officinalis, Callistephus chinensis, Centaurea cyanus, Dahlia pinnata, Emilia flammea, Erigeron canadensis, Erigeron linifolius, Helichrysum bracteatum and Senecio cruentus. They bore into the flower-bud, flower, terminal end of the stem or the fork of the stem of the host plant. When the larva bores into the stem, it makes a tunnel. The larva pupates within the stem or flower.

Taxonomy
Some authors consider Platyptilia molopias to be a synonym of Platyptilia farfarellus.

References

External links
Taxonomic and Biological Studies of Pterophoridae of Japan (Lepidoptera)
Insects of Micronesia Volume 9, no. 3 Lepidoptera: Pterophoridae
Japanese Moths
Fauna Europaea

farfarellus
Moths of Japan
Moths of Europe
Moths of Africa
Moths described in 1867